Mahadeo Singh Law College is a private Law school situated at Sarai in Bhagalpur in the Indian state of Bihar. It offers undergraduate 3 years LL.B. course which is approved by Bar Council of India (BCI), New Delhi and affiliated to Tilka Manjhi Bhagalpur University. Mahadeo Singh Law College was established in 1986.

References

Law schools in Bihar
Universities and colleges in Bihar
Educational institutions established in 1986
1986 establishments in Bihar
Education in Bhagalpur district
Colleges affiliated to Tilka Manjhi Bhagalpur University